This is a list of cities and major towns in Gambia.

 Abuko 6,570
 Bakau
 Banjul
 Bansang
 Basse Santa Su
 Brikama
 Brufut
 Farafenni
 Gimara Bakadaji
 Gunjur
 Janjanbureh (Georgetown)
 Jufureh
 Kalagi
 Kanilai
 Kerewan
 Kololi
 Kuntaur
 Lamin (North Bank Division)
 Lamin (Western Division)
 Mansa Konko
 Nema Kunku
 Serekunda
 Soma
 Sukuta
 Tanji

See also
 List of villages in the Gambia

External links

Gambia
List
Cities